The Battle of Sironj was a military engagement between the Mughal army led by Firuz Jung and the Marauding Maratha troops led by Nima Sindhia, the Mughals were victorious and the Marathas were repulsed from Sironj.

in October 1703, after the rains were over, the Maratha general Nima Sindhia, launched a raid with 50,000 horsemen into Mughal territories, he first marched to Berar where he met Rustam khan the governer of Berar, and defeated him, he then raided hushangabad district and marched into malwa, sacking and ravaging everything in his way until he reached the city of Sironj where he laid siege to it, the Mughal garrison resisted the Marathas.

when news reached Aurangzeb, he ordered Firuz Jung to catch up with the raiders and defeat them, leaving Berar in November 1703, however the march was slow due to heavy baggage, he abandoned the baggage and camped at Burhanpur, he swiftly marched to relieve Sironj, reaching there, he engaged the Marathas, defeated its vanguard and forced his way to the elephant ridden by Nima, seeing the relief army, he fled on his horse with his remaining followers to Bundelkhand, many Marathas were slain in the battlefield, the Mughals recaptured the looted treasure from the Marathas and prisoners were released.

References

Sieges involving the Maratha Empire
Battles involving the Maratha Empire
Battles involving the Mughal Empire